Héctor Benaprés (born 31 January 1902, date of death unknown) was a Chilean athlete. He competed in the men's discus throw at the 1928 Summer Olympics.

References

External links

1902 births
Year of death missing
Athletes (track and field) at the 1928 Summer Olympics
Chilean male discus throwers
Olympic athletes of Chile
Place of birth missing